Alzey-Land is a Verbandsgemeinde ("collective municipality") in the district Alzey-Worms, Rhineland-Palatinate, Germany. It is located around the town Alzey, which is the seat of Alzey-Land, but not part of the Verbandsgemeinde.

Alzey-Land consists of the following Ortsgemeinden ("local municipalities"):

Notable residents
William Heilman, born in Albig, United States Congressman from Indiana
 Hildegard von Bingen

References

Verbandsgemeinde in Rhineland-Palatinate